John Kenyon Mason (19 December 1919 – 26 January 2017), CBE, FRCPath, DMJ, FRCPE, FRSE, and known as Ken Mason, was an emeritus professor of Forensic Medicine at the University of Edinburgh School of Law.

Bibliography
J. Kenyon Mason, Graeme Laurie Law and Medical Ethics (Oxford University Press, 2013)
Graeme Laurie, J. Kenyon Mason Mason and McCall-Smith's Law and Medical Ethics (Oxford University Press, 2006)
J. Kenyon Mason Forensic Medicine for Lawyers (Butterworths, 2000)
J. Kenyon Mason Medico-Legal Aspects of Reproduction and Parenthood (Ashgate, 1998)
J. Kenyon Mason, Alexander McCall Smith Medico-legal Encyclopaedia (Butterworth Heinemann, 1987)

References

1919 births
2017 deaths
Academics of the University of Edinburgh
Scottish legal scholars
Scottish solicitors
Fellows of the Royal Society of Edinburgh
Commanders of the Order of the British Empire  
People educated at Downside School